Oyster vermicelli or oyster misua (traditional Chinese: 蚵仔麵線; Taiwanese Hokkien: ô-á mī-sòaⁿ) is a kind of noodle soup originated in Taiwan. Its main ingredients are oysters and misua (Chinese vermicelli). One of the famous places serving this is in Dihua Street, Dadaocheng, Taipei. A tan-brown variety of vermicelli used for this dish is made primarily with wheat flour and salt, and gains its unique colour due to a steaming process which caramelizes the sugars in the dough, allowing it to be cooked for longer periods without breaking down.

An alternative is vermicelli with large intestine, in which oysters are substituted with small segments of pig's large intestine.

See also 
 Chinese noodles
 Misua
 List of noodle dishes
 List of seafood dishes
 Taiwanese cuisine
 Night markets in Taiwan

References 

Taiwanese cuisine
Oyster dishes
Noodle soups
Taiwanese noodle dishes